Sery may refer to the following places in France:
 Sery, Ardennes
 Sery, Yonne
 Séry-lès-Mézières, Aisne
 Séry-Magneval, Oise